State College is a city in central Pennsylvania, United States.

State College may also refer to:

Related to State College, Pennsylvania
 State College Area School District, a school district serving State College
 State College Area High School, a high school inside State College
 State College Spikes, a minor league baseball team based in State College
 State College, PA Metropolitan Statistical Area
 State College-DuBois, PA Combined Statistical Area

In Australia

Secondary schools in Queensland
 Capalaba State College
 Chancellor State College
 Earnshaw State College
 Innisfail State College
 Kawana Waters State College
 Kelvin Grove State College
 Meridan State College
 North Lakes State College
 Spinifex State College

In Dominica
Dominica State College

In Ghana
 Abuakwa State College, a secondary school

In Indonesia
 Indonesian State College of Accountancy

In Nigeria
 Ogun State College of Health Technology
 Nasarawa State College of Education, Akwanga
 Rivers State College of Arts and Science, now Port Harcourt Polytechnic
 Rivers State College of Health Science and Technology

In the Philippines
 Multiple State Colleges, most of which award graduate degrees in at least one academic area

Institutions formerly named "State College"
 Cebu State College, now Cebu Normal University, in the Philippines
 Mindanao Polytechnic State College, now University of Science and Technology of Southern Philippines
 Rizal State College, now University of Rizal System

In the United States

Institutions offering bachelor's degrees
 Bay State College, a private school in Massachusetts
 Bluefield State College, in West Virginia
 Charter Oak State College, in Connecticut
 The Evergreen State College, in Washington state
 State colleges in the University System of Georgia

 Glenville State College, in West Virginia
 Johnson State College, in Vermont
 Lewis-Clark State College, in Idaho
 Lyndon State College, in Vermont
 State colleges in the Nebraska State College System

 Nevada State College
 State colleges in the University System of New Hampshire

 State colleges in the State University of New York

Community colleges offering a limited number of bachelor's degrees
 Bismarck State College, in North Dakota
 State colleges in the Florida College System

Community colleges offering associate degrees
 Carl Albert State College, in Oklahoma
 Connors State College, in Oklanoma
 James A. Rhodes State College, in Ohio
 Lake Region State College, in North Dakota
 Lamar State College–Port Arthur, in Texas
 Lamar State College–Orange, in Texas
 Murray State College, in Oklahoma
 North Central State College, in Ohio
 North Dakota State College of Science
 Potomac State College of West Virginia University
 Prairie State College, in Illinois
 Rose State College, in Oklahoma
 Seminole State College, in Oklahoma
 Stark State College, in Ohio
 Western Oklahoma State College
 Williston State College, in North Dakota
 Zane State College, in Ohio

Institutions formerly named "State College"
 Armstrong State College, now the Armstrong campus of Georgia Southern University
 Bainbridge State College, merged into Abraham Baldwin Agricultural College (ABAC)
 Boston State College, now part of the University of Massachusetts Boston
 Cameron State College, now Cameron University, in Oklahoma
 Castleton State College, now Castleton University, in Vermont
 Clarion State College, now Clarion University of Pennsylvania
 Central State College, now University of Central Oklahoma
 Central Washington State College, now Central Washington University
 Connecticut State College, now University of Connecticut
 Darton State College, now The Darton College of Health Professions at Albany State University, in Georgia
 East Central State College, now East Central University, in Oklahoma
 Edinboro State College, now Edinboro University of Pennsylvania
 Eastern Oregon State College, now Eastern Oregon University
 Eastern Washington State College, now Eastern Washington University
 Fitchburg State College, now Fitchburg State University, Massachusetts
 Framingham State College, now Framingham State University, Massachusetts
 Gainesville State College, now part of University of North Georgia
 Glassboro State College, now Rowan University, in New Jersey
 Indiana State College, now Indiana University of Pennsylvania
 Kearney State College, now University of Nebraska at Kearney
 Lamar State College, now Lamar University, in Texas
 Lowell State College, now part of University of Massachusetts Lowell
 Macon State College, now part of Middle Georgia State University
 Maine State College, now University of Maine
 Mansfield State College, now Mansfield University of Pennsylvania
 Two institutions named Maryland State College,
 from 1916 to 1920, now University of Maryland, College Park
 from 1948 to 1970, now University of Maryland Eastern Shore
 Memphis State College, now University of Memphis, in Tennessee
 Mesa State College, now Colorado Mesa University
 Mississippi State College for Women, now Mississippi University for Women-Milwaukee
 New Hampshire State College, now University of New Hampshire
 New York State College for Teachers, now University at Albany - State University of New York
 North Texas State College, now University of North Texas
 North Adams State College, now Massachusetts College of Liberal Arts
 Pennsylvania State College, now Pennsylvania State University
 Prairie View State College, now Prairie View A&M University, in Texas
 Salem State College, now Salem State University, Massachusetts
 Shippensburg State College, now Shippensburg University of Pennsylvania
 Two institutions named Southern State College,
 from 1951 to 1976, now Southern Arkansas University
 from 1964 to 1971, now University of South Dakota-Springfield
 Southern Utah State College, now Southern Utah University
 State College of Iowa, now the University of Northern Iowa
 State College of Physicians and Surgeons of Indiana, now Indiana University School of Medicine
 State College of Washington, now Washington State University
 Stockton State College, now Stockton University, in New Jersey
 Texas State College for Women, now Texas Woman's University
 Towson State College, now Towson University, in Maryland
 Troy State College, Troy University in Alabama
 Utah Valley State College, now Utah Valley State University
 West Liberty State College, now West Liberty University, in West Virginia
 Western Kentucky State College, now Western Kentucky University
 Western Oregon State College, now Western Oregon University
 Western State College, now Western Colorado University
 Western Washington State College, now Western Washington University
 Westfield State College, now Westfield State University, Massachusetts
 Wisconsin State College, now part of University of Wisconsin System
 Wisconsin State College of Milwaukee, now University of Wisconsin-Milwaukee
 Worcester State College, now Worcester State University, Massachusetts
 Multiple schools that became part of the California State University

See also
 State university, a type of educational institution
 State university (disambiguation)